Cassinia wilsoniae is a species of flowering plant in the family Asteraceae and is endemic to a small area near the border between South Australia and Victoria. It is an erect shrub with densely hairy branchlets, needle-shaped leaves, and corymbs of twenty to fifty ochre-coloured flower heads.

Description
The upper surface of the leaves is yellowish-green and more or lass glabrous and the lower surface is densely covered with cottony hairs. Mostly between twenty and fifty heads are arranged in corymbs  in diameter.

Taxonomy and naming
Cassinia wilsoniae was first formally described in 2009 by Anthony Edward Orchard in Australian Systematic Botany from specimens collected in Wyperfeld National Park in 2004.

Distribution
Cassinia wilsoniae is only known from Wyperfeld National Park, Lake Albacutya and a single collection in South Australia.

References

wilsoniae
Asterales of Australia
Flora of Victoria (Australia)
Flora of South Australia
Plants described in 2009